The New York City mayoral election of 1957 occurred on Tuesday, November 5, 1957. Incumbent Democratic Mayor Robert F. Wagner, Jr. going on to won re-election for a second term in office. Wagner defeated the Republican nominee, businessman Robert K. Christenberry.

Campaign
Incumbent Mayor Robert F. Wagner, Jr. chose to run for reelection to a second term. Wagner received the backing of the powerful Tammany Hall political machine. There was debate within the Liberal Party over their strategy for the 1957 elections. Since the middle of the 1950s, there was increasing pressure for the party to fold and merge with the Democrats. Factions within the party believed the Democrats had evolved past machine politics, meaning there was no need for continued existence of the Liberals. Ultimately the view of party father David Dubinsky prevailed; the Liberals would endorse worthy Democrats and Republicans but maintain a separate structure. The Liberals voted by 280 to 23 on July 10 that they would endorse Wagner for Mayor while running their own candidates for city council races. This was met with criticism by the pro-Liberal New York Post, which labelled the endorsement as "surrender". Wagner also appeared on the City Fusion, an anti-Tammany party, ballot line.

On June 27, the Republican party nominated Robert K. Christenberry at the Ambassador Hotel, of which Christenberry was the president. Though Christenberry had never held elected office, he had previously he was a friend of former governor Thomas Dewey and had been appointed by Dewey to the state Athletic Commission. Christenberry had also served as Vice Consul in Vladivostok and the Dominican Republic as well as the American representative at the inauguration of Paraguayan President Alfredo Stroessner. At the start of his campaign, Christenberry attacked Mayor Wagner, saying he had "a record of indecision" and a "failure to face up to problems". Christenberry centered his campaign around a plan to hire 5,000 new police officers to reduce crime, the reduction of graft and corruption in city government, and halting New York City's population loss. Throughout the campaign, Christenberry attacked Wagner on the issue of crime and claimed that the administration had "miserably failed" on that issue.

The Republican Party split when Vito P. Battista, a sometime Republican, announced a bid for mayor under the banner of the self-created United Taxpayers Party. Battista, an architect and founder of the Institute of Design and Construction ran in opposition to Mayor Wagner's policies on taxation and social services. On WNYC's Campus Press Conference, Battista stated that his party stood for "Lower taxes or the intelligent distribution of the tax dollar in running local city government; the elimination of waste, the elimination of inefficiency, and the proper planning of our community." Battista also railed against communist influence in the city government, and alleged that there were communists living in New York City public housing.

Eric Hass was selected by the Socialist Labor Party in April 1957. Hass had previously been the party's nominee for president in 1952 and 1956. Because of a New York law prohibiting parties from using names held by other parties, the SLP had appeared as the Industrial Government Party on the ballot for many years. Joyce Cowley, a single mother and Trotskyite activist was chosen as the candidate of the Socialist Workers Party. Cowley chose to campaign among female workers, youth, and in the predominantly African-American neighborhood of Harlem.

From the start of the campaign, Wagner was favored for reelection. Though Christenberry was praised by Democrats like Eleanor Roosevelt for his energy and knowledge of the issues, even traditionally Republican newspapers were not optimistic about his chances. Despite this, President Eisenhower and Vice President Nixon appeared with and endorsed Christenberry. Former Governor Dewey endorsed Christenberry just four days before the election in a letter. A Democratic internal poll in August indicated Wagner would win reelection by 350,000 votes and a second poll in September indicated an even larger victory. These polls found Wagner had support from every ethnic group in New York, though Wagner was strongest among Jews, with 75% of Jewish voters supporting him.

Results
Wagner received 69.23% of the vote to Christenberry's 26.86%, a landslide Democratic victory margin of 42.37%. Wagner swept all five boroughs, breaking 60% of the vote in Queens and Staten Island, and breaking 70% of the vote in Manhattan, Brooklyn, and the Bronx.

Results by borough

References

Mayoral election
Mayoral elections in New York City
New York City mayoral
New York City
New York City mayoral election